The 1924 Middle Tennessee State Normal football team represented the Middle Tennessee State Normal School (now known as Middle Tennessee State University) during the 1924 college football season. The team captain was Kenneth Miles.

Schedule

References

Middle Tennessee State Normal
Middle Tennessee Blue Raiders football seasons
Middle Tennessee State Normal football